The Sulawesi striped blue crow (Euploea configurata) is a species of nymphalid butterfly in the Danainae subfamily. It is endemic to Sulawesi, Indonesia.

References

Euploea
Butterflies of Indonesia
Endemic fauna of Indonesia
Fauna of Sulawesi
Taxonomy articles created by Polbot